Babayi Expressway is an expressway in northeastern Tehran.

Expressways in Tehran